Francis Alphonse Wood (24 September 1884 – 4 June 1976) was an Australian rules footballer who played with South Melbourne in the Victorian Football League (VFL).

Wood was a Western Australian, who started out at North Fremantle before playing with South Fremantle in the 1906 season.

He then joined South Melbourne, in 1907, for a two-year stint. In his first season, he played in a Grand Final loss and the following year he represented the VFL at the 1908 Melbourne Carnival.

Once his time at South Melbourne came to an end he signed with Sturt in South Australia.

In 1909 Wood joined Prahran in the Victorian Football Association (VFA) and he was appointed as coach in 1910.

In 1912 Wood joined a team in Broken Hill.

May 1913-1914 Has re-joined Prahran after being blocked by the league.

In 1915 a very brief stint at coaching Hawthorn  before returning to Prahran the same year.

See also
 1908 Melbourne Carnival

Footnotes

External links

 

1884 births
1976 deaths
Australian rules footballers from Western Australia
Sydney Swans players
North Fremantle Football Club players
South Fremantle Football Club players
Sturt Football Club players

Prahran Football Club players
Prahran Football Club coaches